Scoil Uí Chonaill is a Gaelic Athletic Association club based in Dublin, Ireland.

History
Scoil Uí Chonaill CLG was founded in 1950 by Brother Jim Scully, Principal of O’Connell School, initially to provide Gaelic games for pupils and past pupils of O’Connell School.

The Club maintains strong ties with O’Connell Primary and Secondary schools.

Achievements & Facilities 
The last 5 years has seen its facilities transform with the addition of redeveloped unisex changing facilities, club gym and hurling wall. This has helped both men’s teams earn six promotions, including 2 league titles, which is testament to the Club's ambition and effort. There are three Adult Men's teams which play football in AFL2, AFL7 and AFL11. Adult Hurlers play in AHL2 and AHL9 while the Adult Ladies team plays in AFL5, Championships and Cups. The Adult teams also play in hurling and football Championships and Cups organised by the County Board.

Roll of Honour
 Dublin Senior Football Championship Winners 1983, 1986
 Dublin Senior B Hurling Championship Winners 2019
 Dublin Intermediate Hurling Championship Winners 1959, 1969, 1980
 Dublin Intermediate Football Championship Winners 1963
 Dublin Intermediate Hurling League Winners 1958, 1969, 1973
 Dublin Minor Football Championship Winners 1962, 1963, 1964, 1968, 1969
 Dublin Minor Football League Winners 1953, 1963, 1964
 Dublin Minor Football League Division 2 Winners 1977, 1982, 1992, 1994
 Dublin Minor Hurling League Winners 1968
 Dublin Junior Hurling Championship Winners 1958
 Dublin Junior Hurling League Winners 1956 
 Corn Ceitinn Hurling Cup Winners 1969
 Dublin Under 21 Football Championship Winners 1967
 Dublin Under 21 Football League Winners 1969
 Dublin Under 21 Football League Division 2 Winners 1977
 Dublin Under 21 Hurling League Division 1 Winners 1985
 Dublin Under 21 Hurling League Division 2 Winners 1978
 Dublin Senior Football League Division 2 Winners 1977
 Dublin AFL Div. 8 Winners 2015
 Dublin Senior Camogie Championship Winners 1989  Runners-Up 1982
 Dublin Intermediate A Camogie Championship Winners 1979, 1982
 Dublin Intermediate B Camogie Championship Winners 1978, 1980
 Dublin Junior B Camogie Championship Winners 1982
 Dublin Junior C Camogie Championship Winners 1980
 Dublin Junior C Camogie League Winners 1980
 Dublin Senior Hurling League Division 2 Winners 1992

Notable former players
 Robbie Kelleher
 Tommy Naughton
 Larry Shannon
 Siobhán Killeen

References

External links
Club History and Roll of Honour

Gaelic games clubs in Dublin (city)